Zoma Baitler (Šančiai, Lithuania 3 April 1908 – Montevideo, Uruguay, 16 June 1994) was a Lithuanian-born Uruguayan artist and diplomat.

References

1908 births
1994 deaths
Lithuanian emigrants to Uruguay
Naturalized citizens of Uruguay
Lithuanian Jews
Uruguayan Jews
Uruguayan people of Lithuanian-Jewish descent
20th-century Lithuanian painters
20th-century Uruguayan painters
20th-century male artists